Archbishopric of Cologne may refer to:

Roman Catholic Archdiocese of Cologne, the spiritual jurisdiction of the archbishops of Cologne since 
Electorate of Cologne, the temporal jurisdiction of the archbishops of Cologne between the mid-13th century and 1801

See also
Archbishop of Cologne